Early Morning Shakes is the third studio album by American country rock band Whiskey Myers. It was released on February 4, 2014, through Wiggy Thump Records in the United States.

Track listing

Personnel

Whiskey Myers 
 Cody Cannon - lead vocals, rhythm guitar
 John Jeffers - guitars, lap steel guitar, slide guitar, backing vocals
 Cody Tate - guitars, backing vocals
 Gary Brown - bass
 Jeff Hogg - drums

Additional musicians 
 Michael Webb - keyboards
 Chris Hennessee - harp
 Kristen Rogers - backing vocals

Production 
 Dave Cobb - producer, mixing
 Mark Needham - mixing
 Will Brierre - mixing assistant
 Pete Lyman - mastering
 Gary Dorsey & Kaysie Dorsey - art direction, artwork, photography

Reception
Writing for Texas Music Pickers, Chris Fox concluded that the album is "true southern rock without trying to be – it’s authentic, which seems like such a hard thing for artists to accomplish these days." In his review for Louder Than War, Dave Jennings stated that the album "features a fine blend of country, blues, rock and touches of gospel and is evidence of a band that is clearly going places."

References

External links
 
 

2014 albums
Whiskey Myers albums